William Tyrer Gerrard (1831 – 9 July 1866) was an English botanical collector in Natal and Madagascar in the 1860s. The genus Gerrardanthus is named in his honor.

Gerrard was born in Knowsley, Merseyside, England, and died at age 34 of yellow fever in July 1866, in Foulepointe (now Mahavelona), Madagascar. He was active as a botanical collector in Australia and then Natal, where he first collected several genera and over 150 previously unknown species, and from which he sent a stuffed aardvark to the Free Public Library, Derby Museum. He left Natal in April 1865 for coastal Madagascar, where he made large collections of plants, insects, and birds, before succumbing to illness. He last bequest of specimens to Derby Museum in Liverpool was in 1867.

See also 
 List of South African plant botanical authors

References 

 Proceedings of the Liverpool Literary & Philosophical Society, page 22, 1867.
 Proceedings of the Liverpool Literary & Philosophical Society, page 65, 1868.
 Journal of Botany, British and Foreign, Robert Hardwicke, 1866, page 367.

British botanists
Botanists active in Africa
1831 births
1866 deaths